Who Will Walk in the Darkness with You? is the debut album by folk-rock group The Black Swans.

Track listing

References

2004 albums
The Black Swans albums